Daquq Sport Club, is an Iraqi football team based in Daquq District, Kirkuk, that plays in the Iraq Division Two.

Rivalries
The Daquq SC–Al-Hawija SC rivalry is a rivalry between Kirkuk-based association football clubs Daquq and Al-Hawija. Both clubs are currently playing in the Iraq Division Two.

Managerial history
 Haider Ahmed

See also 
 2001–02 Iraq FA Cup

References

External links
 Daquq SC on Goalzz.com
 Iraq Clubs- Foundation Dates

Football clubs in Kirkuk